The 2019 II Lyga season is the third season since return to two divisions system, the twenty-first after switch to spring-to-fall format and the thirty-first overall after the restoration of Independence.

The II Lyga is the third-tier of football in Lithuania. It is divided into the South Zone and the West Zone, this season containing respectively thirteen and ten clubs. The winning teams from each division are promoted to the I Lyga, while the last placed teams from both divisions are relegated to the appropriate regional division of the III Lyga, except in separately regulated cases for the B teams of higher tier clubs. The final list of participants often does not correlate to the final results of the previous season, as the participation is finalized through the Lithuanian Football Federation league licensing process.

II Lyga South Zone

Team changes

In
 Utenis was relegated from the 2018 LFF I Lyga.
 Atlantas B, although relegated, remained in from II Lyga in 2019 as their first team participates in the 2019 A Lyga.
 As FK Panevėžys gained promotion to the 2019 A Lyga, the Panevėžys B was formed and added to 2019 A Lyga.
 Aukštaitija returned to LFF league system for the first time since 2011.
 Newly formed Marijampolė City licensed to the league.
 Vidzgiris returned to LFF league system for the first time since 2011.

Out
 FK Polonija withdrew from participation in any league
 FK Panerys Vilnius withdrew from participation in any league

League table

Results

Attendance

II Lyga West Zone

Team changes

In
 FSK Radviliškis gained promotion from 2018 III Lyga Šiauliai Zone.
 Kražantė finished 7th in 2018 III Lyga Šiauliai Zone, but succeeded in licensing to 2019 II Lyga.

Out
 FK Minija won 2018 II league title and advanced to 2019 I Lyga.
 FK Atmosfera (2012) took 3rd place in 2018 II league, but succeeded in licensing to 2019 I Lyga.
 FA Šiauliai took 6th place in 2018 II league, but succeeded in licensing to 2019 I Lyga.
 Gargždų Pramogos-SC withdrew from Association Football and only played footsal in 2019.
 FK Širvėna Biržai withdrew from participation in any league.
 FK Akmenė withdrew from participation in any league.

League table

Results

Attendance

Number of teams by counties

References

II Lyga
3
Lit
Lit